The following are the national records in athletics in Northern Mariana Islands maintained by Northern Mariana Islands' national athletics federation: Northern Marianas Athletics (NMA).

Outdoor

Key to tables:

+ = en route to a longer distance

h = hand timing

Mx = mark was made in a mixed race

# = not recognised by World Athletics

A = high altitude

Men

†: result obtained as US Citizen prior to arrival on Saipan, Northern Mariana Islands.

Women

†: 12:58.1 by another source.

Indoor

Men

Women

References

External links
 NMA web site

Northern Mariana Islands
Records